Netflix has received multiple Golden Globe Award wins and nominations since 2014.

Film

Best Director

Best Screenplay

Best Animated Feature Film

Best Foreign Language Film

Best Motion Picture – Drama

Best Motion Picture – Musical or Comedy

Television

Best Television Series – Drama

Best Miniseries or Television Film

Best Television Series – Musical or Comedy

Performance in a Motion Picture

Best Actor – Motion Picture Drama

Best Actress – Motion Picture Drama

Best Supporting Actor – Motion Picture

Best Supporting Actress – Motion Picture

Best Actor – Motion Picture Musical or Comedy

Best Actress – Motion Picture Musical or Comedy

Performance in Television

Best Actor – Television Series Drama

Best Actress – Television Series Drama

Best Actor – Miniseries or Television Film

Best Actress – Miniseries or Television Film

Best Actor – Television Series Musical or Comedy

Best Actress – Television Series Musical or Comedy

Best Supporting Actor – Series, Miniseries, or Television Film

Best Supporting Actress – Series, Miniseries, or Television Film

Music

Best Original Song

Best Original Score

See also
Main
 List of accolades received by Netflix

Others
 List of TCA Awards received by Netflix
 List of BAFTA Awards received by Netflix
 List of Daytime Emmy Awards received by Netflix
 List of Primetime Emmy Awards received by Netflix
 List of Screen Actors Guild Awards received by Netflix
 List of Critics' Choice Television Awards received by Netflix
 List of Primetime Creative Arts Emmy Awards received by Netflix

References

Lists of accolades received by Netflix